Fominsky is a rural locality (a village) in Kichmegnskoye Rural Settlement, Kichmengsko-Gorodetsky District, Vologda Oblast, Russia. The population was 25 as of 2002.

Geography 
The distance to Kichmengsky Gorodok is 42 km. Gorka is the nearest rural locality.

References 

Rural localities in Kichmengsko-Gorodetsky District